Montagnais is a meteorite crater located on the continental shelf south of Nova Scotia, Canada.

It measures  in diameter, and its age is estimated to be 50.50 ± 0.76 million years (Eocene). The crater is under the sea and buried beneath marine sediments.

References

External links 
 RASC documentation of the Montagnais structure.

Impact craters of Canada
Eocene impact craters
Landforms of Nova Scotia